Emilda María Alejandra Flores García (born 1986, Guatemala City) is a Guatemalan soprano.

Early life 
She studied Dramatic Arts' at the Superior School of Arts at San Carlos University in Guatemala. She took music lessons with Zoila Luz García Salas (National Conservatory of Guatemala City) and lyric technique with Luis Felipe Girón May (Guatemala), Gustavo Manzitti (Colón Theater Superior Institute of Art, Buenos Aires, Argentina) and Amy Pfrimmer (Tulane University, New Orleans, United States). She refined her vocal and interpretative technique with Massimo Pezzutti (Italy).

Career 
She participated in theater plays, opera and concerts and sang in Central America, South America and the United States.

She participated in the first performance of the lyric opera Il Duce by Federico García Vigil, playing the role of Rachele (Mussolini's wife) at the Solís Theatre in Montevideo (Uruguay). She sang in Rigoletto by Giuseppe Verdi at the Jefferson Performing Arts Center and in several concerts for the Jefferson Performing Arts Society (New Orleans, Louisiana, United States). She was the guest of honor at La Casona de la Ópera in San José, Costa Rica.

Recognition 
Gold Medal at The World Championships of Performing Arts in Los Angeles, California
Arco Iris Maya Trophy for best young voice (Guatemala)
Artist Award of the Year 2004 as Opera Revelation Artist (Guatemala)
Acknowledgment Diploma for her "High Artistic Quality and Lyric Art Contribution" (Guatemalan Ministry of Culture and General Direction of the Arts)
Artist Award of the Year 2014 for Artistic Career in Belcanto (Guatemala)
Distinguished Visitor Diploma of the City of Quetzaltenango (Guatemala) for her artistic labor and cultural collaboration
First Prize at the First Central America Opera Competition – Concecali 2016, San José (Costa Rica)

Gallery

References

External links 
 "Alejandra Flores 1er. lugar internacional en Canto Lírico (1)" by Roberto Arias, 1 October 2016; (part 2), 8 October 2016
 "Guatemalteca Alejandra Flores ganó Concurso Centroamericano de Canto Lírico" by Andrea Marin Castro, University of Costa Rica, 14 September 2016
 "La guatemalteca Alejandra Flores gana concurso de canto lírico en Costa Rica". Pensa Libre, 9 September 2016
 "Alejandra Flores abrirá el Ícaro" by Jefferson Velásquez, deguate.com, 20 November 2015

1986 births
Living people
People from Guatemala City
Universidad de San Carlos de Guatemala alumni
Operatic sopranos
Guatemalan women singers
21st-century women singers